Seven Seas to Calais (in Italy Il dominatore dei sette mari) is a 1962 Italian adventure film in Eastmancolor and CinemaScope, produced by Paolo Moffa, directed by Rudolph Maté (his final film) and Primo Zeglio, that stars Rod Taylor, Keith Michell, and Edy Vessel. The film depicts the career of Britain's Sir Francis Drake.

Plot

Sir Francis Drake (Rod Taylor) is one of Queen Elizabeth I of England's (Irene Worth) leading commanders in its battles with longtime adversary Spain over the gold riches found in the New World. He is a privateer who has no problems about raiding those Spanish gold arsenals, as well as a military commander who plans and executes naval battles with the Spanish Armada. He is also a skilled diplomat who knows how to maneuver in courtly circles.

Cast

Main
 Rod Taylor as Sir Francis Drake
 Keith Michell as Malcolm Marsh
 Edy Vessel as Arabella Ducleau
 Terence Hill as Babington (Credited as Mario Girotti)
 Basil Dignam as Sir Francis Walsingham
 Anthony Dawson as Lord Burleigh
 Gianni Cajafa as Tom Moon
 Irene Worth as Queen Elizabeth I
 Arturo Dominici as Don Bernardino de Mendoza, the Spanish Ambassador
 Marco Guglielmi as Fletcher
 Esmeralda Ruspoli as Mary of Scotland
 Rossella D'Aquino as Potato
 Umberto Raho as King Philip of Spain
 Aldo Bufi Landi as Vigeois

Cameo/Uncredited
 Giuseppe Abbrescia as Chester
 Luciana Gilli as Indian Wife
 Massimo Righi as Lord of the Royal Court
 Anna Santarsiero as Indian Wife
 Gianni Solaro as Admiral Medina Sedonia
 Jacopo TecchivGarcia
 Bruno Ukmar as Emmanuel
 Franco Ukmar as Francisco
 Adriano Vitale as Recalde

Production
The film was mainly shot at the Titanus Appia Studios in Rome, but some scenes were filmed at the Bay of Naples. While filming, Rod Taylor was dating Anita Ekberg at the time.

Reception
According to MGM records, the film earned $1,250,000 in North America and $1,000,000 in the rest of the world, earning it a profit of $293,000.

It had admissions of 534,906 in France.

Biography

References

External links
 
 
 

1962 films
1960s Italian-language films
English-language Italian films
1960s English-language films
Italian historical adventure films
1960s historical adventure films
Films directed by Rudolph Maté
Films set in England
Films set in London
Films set in the 16th century
Films set in the 1580s
Films set in Tudor England
Films directed by Primo Zeglio
Metro-Goldwyn-Mayer films
CinemaScope films
Cultural depictions of Elizabeth I
Cultural depictions of Mary, Queen of Scots
1960s multilingual films
Italian multilingual films
1960s Italian films